Geography of the Federated States of Micronesia (FSM), a country located in the western Pacific Ocean, and in the Micronesia cultural and ecological sub-region of Oceania.

Geography

They are east of the Philippine Islands, and north of the island of New Guinea. The federal capital is Palikir, on Pohnpei island.

The 607 islands are grouped into four states, and from west to east are: 
Yap State
Chuuk State  — before 1990 named Truk.
Pohnpei State  — before 1985 named Ponape.
Kosrae State

Separated from the main islands in southern Pohnpei State are the two islands of Nukuoro and Kapingamarangi. They are geographically part of the Micronesia region, but are linguistically and culturally part of the Polynesia region. The indigenous languages spoken on these two islands are in the Samoic family of Polynesian languages.

Location
The Federated States of Micronesia are an island group in the Caroline Islands Archipelago of the western Pacific Ocean, in the Micronesia sub-region of Oceania.

Located about three-quarters of the way from Hawaii to Indonesia at Geographic coordinates: 
Map references are Oceania and Micronesia.

Dimensions
Area:
Land area — 
Water area (freshwater) — 
Total area — 

The country's total area is four times the size of Washington, D.C. in the U.S.

Coastline:
The combined coastlines of the country's 607 islands equal .

Maritime claims:
Territorial sea (12 nmi) — 
Exclusive economic zone (200 nmi) —

Terrain
The country's 607 islands vary from high mountainous ones to low coral atolls. Geologically, there are volcanic rock outcroppings on the islands of Pohnpei, Kosrae, and Chuuk.

Elevation extremes
Lowest point — shoreline mean sea level of the Pacific Ocean  — 

Extreme points 
The extreme points of the Federated States of Micronesia, the landforms that are farther north, south, east or west — than any other location in the country.
 Northernmost point — Mogmog islet, Ulithi Atoll, Yap State.
 Easternmost point —  unnamed headland on Kosrae island, Kosrae State.
 Southernmost point — Kapingamarangi atoll, Pohnpei State.
 Westernmost point —  Ngulu Atoll, Yap State.

Environment
Environment—current issues:
Overfishing, land and water pollution.

Environment—international agreements:
Party to — Biodiversity, Climate Change-Kyoto Protocol, Desertification, Hazardous Wastes, Law of the Sea, Ozone Layer Protection.
Signed, but not ratified — none of the selected agreements

Land use
Arable land — 2.86%
Permanent crops — 24.29%
Other — 72.86%
Irrigated land — none

Products:
Tropical woods and lumber, marine products, deep-seabed minerals, surface mined phosphate.

Climate

The Federated States of Micronesia enjoys a tropical climate, with quite even, warm temperatures throughout the year.

Precipitation is generally plentiful, with heavy year-round rainfall. Pohnpei reputedly is one of the wettest places on earth, with up to 330 inches (8.4 m) of rain per year. Nevertheless, drought conditions do occur periodically throughout FSM, especially when the El Niño condition moves into the Western Pacific, when groundwater supplies can dwindle to emergency proportions.

Natural hazards
Tropical typhoons are an annual threat, from June to December. The country is located on southern edge of the typhoon belt, with occasionally severe damage, particularly to the low-lying atolls.

Tsunamis and rising sea levels are other natural threats.

See also
Micronesia — sub-region of Oceania.
Melanesia — sub-region to the south.
Polynesia — sub-region to the east.
Geography of Oceania

References

 
Federated States of Micronesia